Jeronimo van Ballegoijen (born 6 February 1990), better known by his stage names Jeronimo and Jeronimo DaSilva, is a Dutch pop singer and actor. He sings in both English and Dutch. He uses the mononym Jeronimo in his musical releases but continues to use his full name or his other stage name in his acting credits.

Early life
Born in Brazil in a family of nine other siblings with him being the 10th child, Jeronimo was adopted by a Dutch family who brought him to the Netherlands. His new family had three biological children of their own and one adopted daughter from Sri Lanka. At age 10, his new parents divorced and he had to move to Sri Lanka with his mother and sister. On his return to the Netherlands, he enrolled in a high school with a musical program. This landed him an acting and singing role in the 2007 coming-of-age film Timboektoe, where he sings "I Could Have Loved You", produced and recorded by the band members of Relax.

Career
In 2011, "I Am No Superman" featuring rapper Stacey "Stay-C" Seedorf was his chart-topping debut in the Netherlands that reached No. 11 in the Singles Top 100 list. This was followed by the 2012 album One Kiss and the successful title track hit "One Kiss" in addition to a number of charting singles. Later on in 2012, he auditioned for the 2012 Dutch Nationaal Songfestival with his song unfortunately becoming a  "sacrifice" in a bid to represent the Netherlands in the 2012 Eurovision Song Contest.

His song "Gi-ga-gantisch" has been used in Efteling's Sprookjesboom de Musical. He also recorded "It's A Fun Thing" for Cartoon Network Asia Pacific, which aimed for the network's Asian market thus embarking on an Asian tour in 2013.

Discography

Albums

Singles

Filmography
2007: Timboektoe as Brian
2012: Mijn vader is een detective: The Battle as Marty

References

External links
Official website
YouTube

1990 births
Living people
Dutch male film actors
21st-century Dutch male singers
21st-century Dutch singers
Dutch adoptees
Brazilian emigrants to the Netherlands